The 2008–09 Boston College Eagles men's basketball team represented Boston College in the 2008–09 NCAA Division I men's basketball season. In 2007–08, they went 14–17 (4–12 ACC). The Eagles were led by twelfth-year head coach Al Skinner, played their games at the Conte Forum, and were members of the Atlantic Coast Conference.

Roster

Schedule

References

Boston College Eagles men's basketball seasons
Boston College
Boston College
Boston College Eagles men's basketball
Boston College Eagles men's basketball
Boston College Eagles men's basketball
Boston College Eagles men's basketball